Agbu Kefas  (born 12 November 1970) is a Nigerian politician, retired Nigerian army lieutenant colonel and the former PDP state chairman, Taraba State.

He is the gubernatorial candidate of the PDP in Taraba State for the 2023 Nigerian gubernatorial elections.

Early life and education
Agbu Kefas was born on 12 November 1970, in Wukari, Taraba State (formally Gongola State), Nigeria to the family of Mr. and Mrs. Kefas. His family is renowned for great strides and achievements in the military and public service. He is a product of some of the most reputable institutions of learning in Nigeria, namely; the Nigerian Defence Academy in Kaduna where he obtained a Bachelor of Science degree in Political Science and Defense Studies in 1994, the University of Ibadan in Oyo State, where he bagged a Masters Degree in Legal Criminology & Security Psychology in 2005 and the Delta State University, Abraka where he obtained a Masters Degree in Public Administration in 2008. Also, he has a number of prestigious Executive education certifications from global institutions like Harvard Kennedy School in US.

Political career
Agbu Kefas retired from the Nigerian army after 21 years of service. Upon his retirement, he was appointed chairman Governing board of directors Nigerian Maritime Administration and Safety Agency (NIMASA) between 2013 and 2015. He was also a member of the Presidential Committee on North-East Initiative from 2016 to 2019 before he fully joined politics by emerging the State Chairman of the Peoples Democratic Party, Taraba State in 2020. In 2022, Agbu Kefas contested in the Taraba State PDP gubernatorial primary election and won.

Personal life
Agbu is married to Patience and they have four children.

References

1970 births
Living people
Peoples Democratic Party (Nigeria) politicians
Nigerian Defence Academy alumni
People from Taraba State